The 1992 NCAA Rifle Championships were contested at the 13th annual competition to determine the team and individual national champions of NCAA co-ed collegiate rifle shooting in the United States. The championship was hosted by Murray State University in Murray, Kentucky. 

Four-time defending champions West Virginia once again retained the team championship, finishing 48 points ahead of Alaska in the team standings. It was the Mountaineers' eighth overall national title.

The individual champions were, for the smallbore rifle, Tim Manges (West Virginia), and Ann-Marie Pfiffner (West Virginia), for the air rifle.

Qualification
Since there is only one national collegiate championship for rifle shooting, all NCAA rifle programs (whether from Division I, Division II, or Division III) were eligible. A total of five teams ultimately contested this championship.

Results
Scoring:  The championship consisted of 120 shots by each competitor in smallbore and 40 shots per competitor in air rifle.

Team title

Individual events

References

NCAA Rifle Championships
1992 in shooting sports
NCAA Rifle Championships
NCAA Rifle Championship